Sir William Parsons, 1st Baronet of Bellamont, PC (Ire) ( – 1650), was known as a "land-hunter" expropriating land from owners whose titles were deemed defective. He also served as Surveyor General of Ireland and was an undertaker in several plantations. He governed Ireland as joint Lord Justice of Ireland from February 1640 to April 1643 during the Irish rebellion of 1641 and the beginning of the Irish Confederate War.

Birth and origins 

William was born in England about 1570, the eldest son of James Parsons and Catherine Fenton. His father was the second son of Thomas Parsons of Diseworth, Leicestershire. William's mother was a daughter of Henry Fenton and Cicely Beaumont, and a sister of Sir Geoffrey Fenton, the Principal Secretary of State in Ireland to Elizabeth I. Both his parents' families were English and Protestant.

Early life 
Parsons settled in Ireland about 1590, in the last years of the reign of Queen Elizabeth I. He became a commissioner of plantations and obtained considerable territorial grants from the Crown. In 1602, Parsons became Surveyor General of Ireland; In 1610 he obtained a pension of £30 (English) per annum for life. In 1611, he was joined with his younger brother Laurence in the supervisorship of the crown lands, with a fee of £60 per annum for life. His proposal that a Court of Wards be established in Ireland was accepted and he became its first master.

MP 1613–1615 
He sat in the Irish House of Commons of the Parliament of 1613–1615, the only Irish Parliament of James I, as one of the two members for Newcastle Borough, County Dublin. This was one of the 39 new boroughs the King created for this parliament in an effort to ensure a Protestant majority.

Marriage and children 
About 1615 William Parsons married his cousin Elizabeth, eldest daughter of John Lany, an Alderman of Dublin, and niece of his maternal uncle Sir Geoffrey Fenton. This marriage made him a cousin of Richard Boyle, 1st Earl of Cork, the dominant Anglo-Irish magnate of his time, to whom he was close.

 
William and Elizabeth had five sons:
 Richard (living 1639), MP for Wicklow Borough, married Lettice Loftus, eldest daughter of Sir Adam Loftus of Rathfarnham, vice-treasurer of the Exchequer, and predeceased his father
 John, married Elizabeth, daughter of Sir Walsingham Cooke, of Tomduffe, County Wexford
 Francis (died 1668) of Garrydice, County Leitrim, married Sarah Faircloath, and left children
 James, died unmarried and
 William, died unmarried

—and seven daughters:
 Catherine, married Sir James Barry, created 1st Baron Barry of Santry
 Margaret, married Thomas Stockdale of Bilton Park,  Yorkshire
 Elizabeth, married Sir William Ussher, of Grange Castle, County Wicklow, grandson of Sir William Ussher, clerk of the  Privy Council of Ireland
 Jane, married Sir John Hoey, Knight of Dunganstown, County Wicklow
 Mary, married Arthur Hill of Hillsborough, County Down
 Anne, married Sir Paul Davys, Secretary of State (Ireland)
 Judith, married Thomas Whyte of Redhills, County Cavan

Later life

Knight and Baronet 
Parsons personally presented surveys of escheated estates to King James I. On 7 June 1620 Parsons was knighted by Oliver St John,.

He was created 1st Baronet Parsons on 10 November. Parsons built or perhps rebuilt Bellamount Castle in 1622. The ruin of a tower remains and stands in Ballymount Park, SW-Dublin, alongside the M50 Motorway. This baronetcy must not be confused with the later baronetcy Parsons of Birr Castle created in 1677.

In 1623 Parsons was sworn a member of the Privy Council of Ireland. On 12 January 1632 Thomas Wentworth, 1st Viscount Wentworth (later Earl of Strafford) was appointed Lord Deputy of Ireland. During the years 1633–40, when Strafford was all-powerful in Ireland, Parsons prudently offered him no open opposition, but he came increasingly to dislike and distrust "that strange man ... a mischief to so many".

Parsons was notorious as a "land-hunter", who acquired lands previously held by Irish clans by dubious legal means. He has been particularly censured by historians for the seizure of the former O'Byrne lands in County Wicklow, although it has also been argued that his behaviour was no worse than that of his partner in the transaction, Lord Lieutenant Wentworth, who proceeded to swindle Parsons out of his share.

MP 1634–1635 and 1639–1649 
According to Bagwell (1909) and Clavin (2009), Parson was one of the two MPs for Armagh County during the Parliament of 1634–1635, the first of Charles I, but the list of Irish MPs compiled in 1878 states that Sir Faithful Fortescue, knight, and Sir George Radcliffe, knight, sat for Armagh County in that parliament.

Parsons sat in the Irish House of Commons of the Parliament of 1639–1649, the second parliament of Charles I, as one of the two members for Wicklow County, at which occasion his residence is given as "Bellamont, Dublin". His son Richard sat for Wicklow Borough.

2nd marriage 
His first wife died in April 1640. He probably remarried soon after this. His second wife was Catherine Jones, a daughter of Arthur Jones, 2nd Viscount Ranelagh.

Lord Justice 
In December 1640 Parsons was appointed Lord Justice jointly with Robert Dillon, the future 2nd Earl of Roscommon. However, Dillon was soon removed as he was considered to have been too close to Strafford. On 10 February 1641 Parsons was resworn with Sir John Borlase, Master-General of the Ordnance.

The King appointed Robert Sidney, 2nd Earl of Leicester Lord Lieutenant of Ireland in 1641 but Leicester never went to Ireland and left the administration of the country to the Lords Justices. Leicester would resign in 1643 to make place for Ormond.

Strafford was executed on 12 May 1641. His downfall ruined those members of the Irish administration who had been close to him, but Parsons, who had quarrelled with Strafford over the O'Byrne land deal, was clearly identified as one of his enemies, and Strafford's fall strengthened Parsons's position in the short term.

When the Irish Rebellion of 1641 broke out, Sir William had to cope with it virtually single-handedly, since his colleague Borlase was incompetent. His management of the crisis has been much criticised, in particular, his habit of dealing with the English Parliament directly without informing King Charles I. His enemies accused him of inflaming, or even provoking the Rebellion, as a pretext for a second and more thorough conquest of Ireland. Certainly he argued that the Rebellion must be crushed ruthlessly, and rejected all attempts at compromise.

Parsons continued in the government until April 1642, when Charles I replaced him with Sir Henry Tichborne. In 1643 Parsons was charged with treason, and committed to prison, together with Adam Loftus, 1st Viscount Loftus and others. He was quickly released, but complained bitterly of this "poor reward" for his "zealous and painful toil on behalf of the Crown". He continued to live in Dublin until 1648 when he retired to England.

Death, succession, and timeline 
Parsons died in January or February 1650 at Westminster, London, and was buried in St Margaret's, Westminster. As his eldest son Richard had predeceased him, he was succeeded by his grandson William as the 2nd Baronet Parsons. The 2nd Baronet married first Catherine, eldest daughter of Arthur Jones, 2nd Viscount Ranelagh, and then Katherine Jones, Viscountess Ranelagh, née Boyle.

See also 
 List of Irish Parliaments

Notes and references

Notes

Citations

Sources 

 
 
  – 1603 to 1642
 
 
 
  – L to M (for Earl of Leicester)
  – N to R
  – 1611 to 1625
  – 1665 to 1707
 
 
  – (for timeline)
  – (for the subject and his son Richard as MPs)
  – Viscounts (for Ranelagh)
  – Knights bachelors & Index
  – 1641 to 1643

1650 deaths
17th-century Anglo-Irish people
Baronets in the Baronetage of Ireland
Burials at St Margaret's, Westminster
English knights
Irish MPs 1613–1615
Irish MPs 1639–1649
Members of the Parliament of Ireland (pre-1801) for County Dublin constituencies
Members of the Parliament of Ireland (pre-1801) for County Wicklow constituencies
People of Elizabethan Ireland
People of the Irish Confederate Wars
Surveyors General of Ireland
Year of birth unknown